Janine Culliford (née Devroye; 29 March 1930 – 5 July 2016) was a Belgian colorist of comic strips.

Nine Culliford was the wife of the comic strip creator known as Peyo (the pseudonym of Pierre Culliford, 1928–1992). She colored his illustrations up until his death.

She is especially notable for coming up with the idea that the Smurfs should be colored blue. After the death of her husband, she continued to color the comic strips produced by the studio founded by her son Thierry who has been continuing the work of Peyo.

She died on 5 July 2016 at the age of 86.

The 2017 film Smurfs: The Lost Village is dedicated to her memory.

References 

1930 births
2016 deaths
Belgian comics artists
Place of death missing
Place of birth missing
Belgian female comics artists
Comics colorists
Peyo
Female comics writers